The 1998–99 OB I bajnokság season was the 62nd season of the OB I bajnokság, the top level of ice hockey in Hungary. Four teams participated in the league, and Alba Volan Szekesfehervar won the championship.

Regular season

Playoffs

3rd place 
 Újpesti TE - Ferencvárosi TC 0:2 (2:4, 4:12)

Final 
 Alba Volán Székesfehérvár - Dunaferr Dunaújváros 4:2 (3:2, 2:3, 2:3, 6:4, 3:1, 5:4 OT)

External links
 Season on hockeyarchives.info

OB I bajnoksag seasons
Hun
OB